Al Safliya Island is an island located off the coast of Doha, the capital city of Qatar.

The island is located 3 miles north of Ras Abu Aboud. A popular tourist destination among locals, journey by boat from Doha takes roughly 30 to 40 minutes.

Description
Al Safliya Island is about 2 miles long east to west, very narrow, and curves with the northern side of the Doha Port; it is low, sandy and has clusters of grass. The northern reef projects 1 ½ miles southeastward from the island; it is mainly sand, and outside the entrance trends northeastward and northward for some miles.

Conservation
In 2015, the Ministry of Municipality and Environment initiated a clean-up campaign for the island of Al Safliya which included removing the waste and plastic cans that have been left on the island by visitors. They also installed 35 pergolas.

See also

 List of islands of Qatar

References

Doha
Islands of Qatar